The won was the first South Korean currency and was in use from August 15, 1945, to February 15, 1953.

Etymology

Won is a cognate of the Chinese yuan and Japanese yen. The won was subdivided into 100 jeon (전; 錢; McCune-Reischauer: chŏn; revised: jeon).

History

Following the end of the Colonial Era and the division of Korea, the won was introduced to replace the Korean yen. The first banknotes were issued by the Bank of Joseon until 1950, when the currency management switched to the Bank of Korea.

At the time of its introduction in 1945 the won was pegged to the Japanese yen at a rate of 1 won = 1 yen. In October of the same year the anchor currency was changed to the US dollar at a rate of 15 won = 1 dollar. Toward the end of the Korean War the won was devalued at 6000 won = 1 dollar. Following that the hwan was introduced as the new currency at a rate of 1 hwan = 100 won.

Coin
The 1 jeon coin was the only coin in circulation in South Korea at the time.  It was not issued by the Bank of Joseon but by the Japanese government as subsidiary money.

Banknotes

Bank of Joseon issued notes
The won was subdivided into 100 jeon. Only banknotes were issued. Initially, the won was issued by Bank of Joseon with a similar design to the older notes of the Japanese occupation period. However, there were two subtle and important differences. The new notes replaced the paulownia, the badge of the government of Japan, with the Rose of Sharon, South Korea's national flower; and the clause about exchangeability with the Japanese yen was removed.

Bank of Korea issued notes
On June 12, 1950, the Bank of Korea was established and assumed the duties of Bank of Joseon. The Bank of Joseon's notes were still kept in circulation as not all denominations were replaced by the Bank of Korea's notes.

See also

Economy of South Korea
History of South Korea

References

External links
 Bank of Korea, 1950-1953 banknotes
Bank of Korea, A Brief History of Korean Currency
Bank of Korea, Currency Issue System
National Printing Bureau

Currencies of South Korea
Modern obsolete currencies
1945 in South Korea
1945 establishments in Korea
1953 disestablishments in South Korea
Economic history of South Korea